In geometry, the cyclotruncated simplectic honeycomb (or cyclotruncated n-simplex honeycomb) is a dimensional infinite series of honeycombs, based on the symmetry of the  affine Coxeter group. It is given a Schläfli symbol t0,1{3[n+1]}, and is represented by a Coxeter-Dynkin diagram as a cyclic graph of n+1 nodes with two adjacent nodes ringed. It is composed of n-simplex facets, along with all truncated n-simplices.

It is also called a Kagome lattice in two and three dimensions, although it is not a lattice.

In n-dimensions, each can be seen as a set of n+1 sets of parallel hyperplanes that divide space. Each hyperplane contains the same honeycomb of one dimension lower.

In 1-dimension, the honeycomb represents an apeirogon, with alternately colored line segments. In 2-dimensions, the honeycomb represents the trihexagonal tiling, with Coxeter graph . In 3-dimensions it represents the quarter cubic honeycomb, with Coxeter graph  filling space with alternately tetrahedral and truncated tetrahedral cells. In 4-dimensions it is called a cyclotruncated 5-cell honeycomb, with Coxeter graph , with 5-cell, truncated 5-cell, and bitruncated 5-cell facets. In 5-dimensions it is called a cyclotruncated 5-simplex honeycomb, with Coxeter graph , filling space by 5-simplex, truncated 5-simplex, and bitruncated 5-simplex facets. In 6-dimensions it is called a cyclotruncated 6-simplex honeycomb, with Coxeter graph , filling space by 6-simplex, truncated 6-simplex, bitruncated 6-simplex, and tritruncated 6-simplex facets.

Projection by folding 

The cyclotruncated (2n+1)- and 2n-simplex honeycombs and (2n-1)-simplex honeycombs can be projected into the n-dimensional hypercubic honeycomb by a geometric folding operation that maps two pairs of mirrors into each other, sharing the same vertex arrangement:

See also
 Hypercubic honeycomb
 Alternated hypercubic honeycomb
 Quarter hypercubic honeycomb
 Simplectic honeycomb
 Omnitruncated simplectic honeycomb

References 
 George Olshevsky, Uniform Panoploid Tetracombs, Manuscript (2006) (Complete list of 11 convex uniform tilings, 28 convex uniform honeycombs, and 143 convex uniform tetracombs)
 Branko Grünbaum, Uniform tilings of 3-space. Geombinatorics 4(1994), 49 - 56.
 Norman Johnson Uniform Polytopes, Manuscript (1991)
 Coxeter, H.S.M. Regular Polytopes, (3rd edition, 1973), Dover edition,  
 Kaleidoscopes: Selected Writings of H.S.M. Coxeter, edited by F. Arthur Sherk, Peter McMullen, Anthony C. Thompson, Asia Ivic Weiss, Wiley-Interscience Publication, 1995,  
 (Paper 22) H.S.M. Coxeter, Regular and Semi Regular Polytopes I, [Math. Zeit. 46 (1940) 380-407, MR 2,10] (1.9 Uniform space-fillings)
 (Paper 24) H.S.M. Coxeter, Regular and Semi-Regular Polytopes III, [Math. Zeit. 200 (1988) 3-45]

Honeycombs (geometry)
Polytopes
Truncated tilings